Deus Deceptor is the first full-length album by the Swedish Death metal band NonExist.

Track listing

Credits
 Johan Liiva - Vocals
 Johan Reinholdz - Guitar/Bass
 Matte Modin - Drums

2002 albums
NonExist albums